Lindfors is a Swedish surname. Notable people with the surname include:

Adolf Lindfors (born 1879), Finnish wrestler and Olympic champion in Greco-Roman wrestling
Anton Lindfors (born 1991), Finnish-Swedish snowboarder
Arthur Lindfors (born 1893), Finnish wrestler and Olympic medalist in Greco-Roman wrestling
Lill Lindfors (born 1940), Finnish-Swedish jazz singer
Sakari Lindfors (born 1966), retired professional ice hockey player who played in the SM-liiga
Stefan Lindfors (born 1962), Finnish industrial designer, interior designer, film-maker and sculptor
Viveca Lindfors (1920–1995), Swedish/American stage and film actress

Swedish-language surnames